The 2003-04 Azerbaijan Top League was contested by fourteen clubs. It started on 17 May 2003 and finished on 5 May 2004. The title was won by Neftchi Baku for the fourth time.

Teams

Stadia and locations

League table

Umid Baku removed from the league on July 21

Results

Season statistics

Top scorers

References

External links
Azerbaijan 2003-04 RSSSF

Azerbaijan Premier League seasons
Azer
1